The 2003 Arizona Wildcats football team represented the University of Arizona during the 2003 NCAA Division I-A football season. They were coached by John Mackovic in his third season with the Wildcats. Arizona completed the season with a record of 2–10 (1–7 against Pac-10 opponents) and finished in last place in the Pac-10 standings.

After starting the year 1–4, Mackovic was fired and defensive coordinator Mike Hankwitz coached the team on an interim basis for the rest of the season.

Before the season
Arizona concluded the 2002 season with a 4–8 record, in yet another losing season under Mackovic. The last part of the season became a part of controversy that involved Mackovic mistreating players, which led to the team reporting to the school about the coach’s behavior toward them. Mackovic would later apologize for his actions and promised to fix his mistakes.

During the offseason, Mackovic fired both of his coordinators to rebuild the program back to its winning ways. Several players on the team threatened to leave the roster or transfer to other schools unless Mackovic changed his attitude. Also, the Wildcats brought in a weak recruiting class, perhaps due to the Mackovic fallout. Fewer fans would attend the team’s annual spring game in April as a result.

By the offseason, Mackovic would be placed on the hot seat and was favored by football analysts to be the first coach fired during the year, and that the Wildcats needed to win more games to save Mackovic’s job. Arizona was picked to finish last in the Pac-10, as many believed that Arizona would not win more with Mackovic in charge.

Schedule

Game summaries

UTEP
Arizona opened the season by hosting UTEP. In their first meeting against the Miners since 1999, the Wildcats would dominate on all phases and cruised to a victory. UTEP’s only score was an interception return early in the fourth quarter after Arizona brought in backup players with the game already out of reach. Also, the game featured Arizona Stadium having the smallest attendance for a home opener since 1997, as fewer fans attended as a result of a lack of interest due to Mackovic still being the Wildcats coach to start the season.

LSU
The Wildcats hosted LSU in their next game in the first meeting between the two since 1984. Unfortunately for Arizona, the 13th-ranked Tigers would score early and would break the game open by halftime with a 38-0 lead as Arizona’s fans began to head for the exits. The Wildcats would finally score in the fourth quarter to break up a shutout bid, but their big halftime deficit would be too much for them and their record evened to 1–1. Fans chanted for Mackovic to be fired near the end of the game, as they wanted the team to move on from the embattled coach.

Oregon
Arizona opened Pac-10 play against Oregon. It was the third consecutive year that the Wildcats played a home game against the Ducks. 

Hours before the game started, a plane with a banner that read “Hey U of A, Please Fire Mackovic” flew over the Arizona campus, as many in the Tucson community beyond Wildcat fans demanded that Mackovic be fired as coach and have the program be in a new direction.

In the game, the Wildcats would again struggle as the Ducks would dominate on both sides of the ball as Arizona was blown out again. Chants of “Fire Mackovic” would ring through the Arizona student section in the game’s final minutes.

After the game, Mackovic, angry after another blowout loss, would lose his temper and trashed his office after ending postgame interviews.

Purdue
Arizona went on the road for the first time in the season by traveling to Purdue. It was the very first meeting between the two teams. The Boilermakers would be too much for the Wildcats in yet another blowout loss for Arizona. It was the third straight game that Arizona gave up over 40 points to its opponents.

Mackovic, still frustrated after yet another blowout loss, would have another postgame meltdown in the locker room, as he would toss footballs against lockers that nearly hit players as well as yelling obscenities and insulting them. He also threw a Gatorade cooler, a trash can, and a chair against the wall. The players would report the incidents to the university as well as their families who then became angered with Mackovic. The Pac-10 would later reprimand him for his actions and he apologized to the players, the university, and fans. The issues surrounding Mackovic and the team’s losses would become speculation that the Wildcats would soon make a coaching change.

TCU
Arizona went back home and faced TCU in a rematch of the teams’ meeting from 1999 (when Arizona came back to win that game). Both teams would rely on defense which led to a low scoring game. The Wildcats led 10-7 in the fourth quarter before the Horned Frogs forced overtime with a field goal. In the first overtime period, Arizona would commit a turnover with an interception which gave the Frogs a chance at the win. TCU would convert on a field goal to win it 13-10 and handed the Wildcats yet another loss as fans chanted “Fire Mackovic” one last time. Both teams have not met since.

Mackovic’s firing
The day after Arizona’s loss to TCU, Mackovic was fired as coach and that Hankwitz, the team’s defensive coordinator, would take over as interim coach for the remainder of the season. Mackovic finished his Arizona tenure with a 10–18 record, and was 3–14 against Pac-10 foes.

In a press conference, Arizona announced that Mackovic’s dismissal was due to the following reasons:
Wins and losses, especially those against ranked opponents as well as Pac-10 teams
A poor relationship with players and fans
The inability to build a winning culture for the program and make bowl game appearances
Failure to meet expectations by contending for a Rose Bowl
Weak recruiting, especially before the season as the team was ranked near the bottom of the Pac-10 in terms of player commitments 
The controversies from both the previous season and this one as a result of abusing and insulting players, including the postgame locker room meltdown after the loss to Purdue
The failure to win Pac-10 games at home and having losing streaks during the two-and-a-half-season span

At the time, the Wildcats were outscored in their losses, 179-40 after their win over UTEP in the season opener. During the losses, fans chanted for Mackovic to be fired and fans held signs that referenced his firing, including one that had his name in front of a fire blaze and another with the Terminator saying “Hey Mackovic, You Are Terminated!” (likely as a reference to the third Terminator film being released in the summer prior to the start of the season), and rejoiced after hearing the news of him being fired. When Mackovic was seen leaving the Arizona campus, a group of fans chanted “You’ve been fired” at him and sang “Na na, hey hey, goodbye” and “Hit the Road, Jack” as he departed the campus for good.

Hankwitz, who was previously on the Arizona coaching staff in the 1970s along with Mackovic under former coach Jim Young, was formerly the defensive coordinator at Texas A&M before being hired at Arizona this season. He would take over the program and attempted to fix the team’s problems caused by Mackovic and promised to bring the team back to its winning ways.

Washington State
The Wildcats visited Washington State in their first game after Mackovic was fired. Under Hankwitz, Arizona would keep close with the Cougars, but their offense continued to struggle and would lose again.

UCLA
Arizona faced UCLA in their first home game since Mackovic’s firing. The Wildcats started off good, and would seem to take control by halftime, leading 21-10. However, the Bruins got back in the game and a fourth-quarter interception return touchdown gave them the lead. Arizona tried to respond, but committed crucial mistakes, including a missed field goal in the final few minutes, that would ultimately cost them and UCLA gave the Wildcats yet another tough defeat and Arizona dropped to 1–6.

Washington
On homecoming weekend, the Wildcats hosted Washington and looked to end their losing streak, which was now at eight games. Arizona would hang with the Huskies early on, and by the fourth quarter, the Wildcats took control a pair of long rushing touchdowns. Washington would answer to cut into Arizona’s lead and was poised to take the lead late, but would be stopped by the Wildcats on a fourth down play, and Arizona held on to win. As time ran out, Arizona fans rushed the field and celebrated as the Wildcats finally broke their losing skid and won for the first time in the post-Mackovic era.

The win was Arizona’s first win over the Huskies since 1998 after a string of near-misses against them and the first time that the Wildcats defeated them at home since their memorable upset in 1992. Also, it was Hankwitz’s first win as coach and Arizona’s first Pac-10 home win since 2000 (when they defeated the Huskies’ rival Washington State in what turned out to be Dick Tomey’s final victory as Wildcat coach), as well as their first conference win of the season. In addition, it was Arizona’s first home win in November since 1998, when they defeated rival Arizona State that year.

A memorable moment occurred late in the game, after Wildcats stopped the Huskies on their final possession. Half of the Arizona student section chanted “Where is Mackovic?” and the other half responded with “He got fired!”, which referenced the fact that they didn’t have to deal with the Wildcats blowing another late lead against the Huskies, which happened twice under Mackovic when they played in Seattle in his first two years (as well as 2000 in Tomey’s last year). Now that Mackovic was no longer coach and Arizona finally winning, it led to the chants before having new chants of “U of A” when the Wildcats ran out the clock.

USC
Coming off of their thrilling victory over Washington, Arizona faced second-ranked USC in a very tough test. Unfortunately for the Wildcats, they would have no chance as the Trojans showed why they were championship contenders by dominating Arizona from start to finish for a shutout victory. By halftime, the stadium would become half empty as most of the Arizona fans headed for the exits as USC had broken the game open. It was the first time that an opponent shut out Arizona since 1991, when the Wildcats were blanked at Washington.

Near the end of the game, Arizona fans chanted “We’ve got basketball”, as they gave up on football season (despite the Wildcats having one final game against Arizona State), and turned their attention to basketball, as it been usually with that program winning.

Arizona State

The Wildcats attempted to end the season on a high note, as they traveled to Tempe for the annual rivalry game against Arizona State. However, Arizona would have trouble slowing down ASU’s passing offense and made mistakes that would cost them points. In the end, the Wildcats were held to only seven points, which was their lowest in the rivalry since 1992 and lost their tenth game of the season, which was a school record. Also, the loss put the Wildcats into finishing the season last (10th place) in the Pac-10 standings with a 2–10 record.

Awards and honors
Mike Bell, RB, Second-team All-Pac-10

Season notes
The season is among the worst in Arizona history and the ten losses were the most in a single season for the Wildcats until it was broken in 2021 when Arizona would lose eleven games in that season. Fans have blamed the losses due to Mackovic’s issues and the team’s poor play, including turnovers, penalties, player inexperience, and a bad defense. Also, the team’s offensive performance earlier in the season as well as missed field goals were factors in the losing record.

Many players would lose interest in football after Mackovic’s troubles and fans gave up their season tickets after the team’s losses during the year, although the fans considered to not attend games after Mackovic’s troubles late in the 2002 season.

The early part of the season was best known for Arizona fans using chants that called for Mackovic to be fired before the ending of the Wildcats’ blowout losses, and made references to the basketball team in the home finale late in the season against USC.

The Wildcats would not play twelve games in a season again until 2006.

Arizona and UTEP would not meet each other again until 2017.

Arizona lost to the two teams that would eventually share the national championship this season (LSU and USC).

The game against Purdue was only broadcast on pay-per-view in the Arizona market as part of the now-defunct ESPN GamePlan, as national broadcasters believed that Arizona would not have a chance at a win and because of the issues surrounding Mackovic at the time.

Arizona would not play another overtime game until 2009.

The Wildcats would not lose another home game against UCLA until 2013.

Arizona scored a touchdown against Oregon State for the first time since 1999, as they only scored on field goals from 2000-02.

The victory over Washington was Hankwitz’s first and only win as a coach.

The game against USC was the only home game of the season that had an attendance below 40,000, like due to the fact that the Wildcats were never expected to win against the Trojans and that most of the Arizona fans were focused on basketball.

Arizona played three games that were aired on TBS, with all being blowout losses. Fans believed that TBS would not broadcast another Arizona game again as a result of the losses, though the network would air one Arizona game in 2005 and 2006.

The Wildcats only scored seven points against Arizona State, which would be the fewest for Arizona in the rivalry until 2020 when they would also be held to seven points in an ugly loss.

Arizona did not play Pac-10 foe Stanford this season.

Arizona only made two field goals in the entire season and was one of the nation’s worst special teams group. They would finish the year two for eleven in field goal tries, with the only made kicks occurring against Oregon and TCU.

The 2–10 2003 record was an opposite of the 1993 record for the Wildcats, as they went 10–2 in that season.

The Mackovic era was proved to be a total failure for the Wildcats, and fans rated Mackovic as the worst Arizona football coach ever (with predecessor Dick Tomey being the best). The fans also believed that Mackovic destroyed the program due to his problems and that it would take several seasons for Arizona to recover and rebuild under future coaches in order for the program to be returned to success as it was under Tomey.

This was the last season in which the Wildcats wore white helmets full-time. They would switch to blue helmets in 2004 and would not wear the white helmets again until 2009.

The two wins were the fewest in a season by Arizona since 1957, when they finished 1–8–1. However, in 2021, Arizona went 1–11, which tied the 1957 team record for fewest victories in a full season.

After the season
Soon after the season ended, Arizona hired Oklahoma defensive coordinator Mike Stoops as the new head coach following a national search, meaning that Hankwitz would not return for the 2004 season. Stoops, who had served under his brother Bob at Oklahoma, was hired to rebuild the program and to build a winning culture that was lost under Mackovic. He would go to spend most of the decade rebuilding the team and the Wildcats would return to its winning ways by 2008 before being fired in 2011. As for Hankwitz, he would later become defensive coordinator at Northwestern.

References

Arizona
Arizona Wildcats football seasons
Arizona Wildcats football